The Trading with the Enemy Act 1914 was an Act of the Parliament of the United Kingdom that prescribed an offence of conducting business with any person of "enemy character".  It was enacted soon after the United Kingdom became involved in World War I.

Trading with the Enemy Amendment Act 1916
Under the 1914 Act, ownership of enemy assets (unless the property was insignificant) had been put in trust and held by the Public Trustee; business activities were monitored by the Board of Trade. The 1916 amendment required trustees to liquidate those holdings and hold the sale proceeds in trust for the enemy until the end of hostilities.

Impact of the act

Daimler Co Ltd v Continental Tyre and Rubber Co (GB) Ltd, 1916 created case law as regards a company as a legal person, just like a natural person. can have enemy character though established in the UK.

The Hamburg-Amerika House, premises of the Hamburg America Line, 14-16 Cockspur Street, London, were offered for sale in 1917. The buyer was required to fill in a form to confirm on purchase that they were not purchasing on behalf of any nation "at war with Great Britain".

See also
Daimler Co Ltd v Continental Tyre and Rubber Co (Great Britain) Ltd
Trading with the Enemy Act

References

United Kingdom Acts of Parliament 1914
Repealed United Kingdom Acts of Parliament
Treason in the United Kingdom
World War I legislation
Economic warfare